Geoff Bell (born 1973) is a former Scotland international rugby league footballer who played as a  or er in the 1990s and 2000s. A Scotland international and Queensland interstate representative, he played club football for the Cronulla-Sutherland Sharks, North Queensland Cowboys and the Penrith Panthers.

Playing career
Bell was selected to play for the Queensland rugby league team in the 1997 Super League Tri-series. He also played on the wing in the Cronulla-Sutherland Sharks' loss at the 1997 Super League Grand Final to the Brisbane Broncos.

Bell was selected to travel to Europe and play for the Scotland national rugby league team at the 2000 World Cup. In 2002, Bell changed clubs but stayed in Sydney when he moved from the Cronulla-Sutherland Sharks to the Penrith Panthers.

References

External links
Statistics at rleague.com

1973 births
Living people
Australian people of Scottish descent
Australian rugby league players
Cronulla-Sutherland Sharks players
North Queensland Cowboys players
Penrith Panthers players
Queensland rugby league team players
Rugby league centres
Rugby league wingers
Scotland national rugby league team players